The Alba AR1 was a one-off experimental open-wheel formula racing car, designed by ex-Osella engineer Giorgio Stirano, and developed and built by Italian manufacturer Alba Engineering; constructed to Formula 3 regulations, in 1981.

References

Open wheel racing cars
Rear-wheel-drive vehicles
Mid-engined cars
Formula Three cars
Cars introduced in 1981
Cars of Italy